Mathias Bay-Smidt (born 19 March 1996) is a Danish badminton player. In 2014, he won his first senior international title at the Finnish International tournament in the men's doubles event partnered with Frederik Søgaard. In 2016, he won the Czech International tournament in the mixed doubles event partnered with Alexandra Bøje after fight through the qualification round, with the eight matches played.

Achievements

European Junior Championships 
Boys' doubles

BWF World Tour (1 title, 1 runner-up) 
The BWF World Tour, which was announced on 19 March 2017 and implemented in 2018, is a series of elite badminton tournaments sanctioned by the Badminton World Federation (BWF). The BWF World Tours are divided into levels of World Tour Finals, Super 1000, Super 750, Super 500, Super 300 (part of the HSBC World Tour), and the BWF Tour Super 100.

Men's doubles

Mixed doubles

BWF International Challenge/Series (5 titles, 8 runners-up) 
Men's doubles

Mixed doubles

  BWF International Challenge tournament
  BWF International Series tournament
  BWF Future Series tournament

References

External links 
 

1996 births
Living people
People from Odder Municipality
Danish male badminton players
Sportspeople from the Central Denmark Region